"When It Rain" is a song by American hip hop recording artist Danny Brown, released as the lead single from his fourth studio album Atrocity Exhibition. It was produced by Paul White. The single was released digitally on June 14, 2016.

Music video 
The music video for "When It Rain" was released on June 14, 2016 on the official Danny Brown Vevo YouTube channel. The song's music video has over 4.2 million views on YouTube as of May 2020.

Track listing

References 

2016 singles
2016 songs
American hip hop songs
Alternative hip hop songs
Warp (record label) singles